La Viña Airport ,  is an airstrip serving Guangualí (es), a village in the Coquimbo Region of Chile.

There is rising terrain to the south, and a dropoff into the river valley to the north.

See also

Transport in Chile
List of airports in Chile

References

External links
OpenStreetMap - La Viña
OurAirports - La Viña
FallingRain - La Viña Airport

Airports in Coquimbo Region